La Courneuve – Aubervilliers is a station on the line B of the Réseau Express Régional, a hybrid suburban commuter and rapid transit line. It is named after the town of La Courneuve where the station is located, and the nearby town of Aubervilliers, both northern suburbs of Paris, in the Seine-Saint-Denis department of France.

See also
List of stations of the Paris RER

References

External links

 

Railway stations in France opened in 1885
Railway stations in Seine-Saint-Denis
Réseau Express Régional stations